José Carlos Granero Granero (born 27 May 1963) is a Spanish former professional footballer who played as a right-back or a central defender, currently a manager.

He was known as a promotion specialist, winning promotion four times each to Segunda División B and Segunda División, and earning two more in China later in his career.

Playing career
Born in Chella, Valencia, Granero spent six years with local giants Valencia CF, but was mainly associated with the reserves, his best output being 15 appearances in the 1984–85 campaign (seven starts). He made his La Liga debut on 15 January 1984, in a 2–1 away loss against Real Valladolid.

Granero left the Che in 1986, then spent a couple of years in Segunda División with Recreativo de Huelva, playing no matches in the 1987–88 season. He retired in 1994 at the age of 31 after spells with CD Alcoyano and Benidorm CD – Segunda División B – and amateurs CD Jávea, all in his native region.

Coaching career
Granero started training with his last club, going on to work in the lower leagues the following seasons. In 1996, he led Llíria CF to the first place in the Tercera División regular season, subsequently disposing of FC Cartagena, FC Santboià and UD Poblense in the promotion playoffs; still in the late 90s, he achieved promotions to the third tier with Ontinyent CF, Benidorm and Novelda CF.

In 2007–08, Granero was in charge of Alicante CF as it returned to division two after a 50-year absence. He was unable to prevent instant relegation the following campaign (he was sacked midway through it, being reinstated shortly after), meeting the exact same fate with SD Ponferradina (promotion in 2010 followed by relegation).

On 18 October 2011, Granero was appointed at Deportivo Alavés in the third division, after Luis de la Fuente was dismissed. He left the Mendizorrotza Stadium the following June, and continued working at that level the next two seasons with Real Oviedo.

On 28 May 2014, Granero was signed as head coach of Veria FC, as the Super League Greece team's director of football was compatriot Quique Hernández. He then returned to his country, where he managed two sides in the third tier.

Granero headed back abroad on 24 November 2017, signing for the upcoming year to Chengdu Better City F.C. who had been relegated to China's fourth division. He won immediate back-to-back promotions to the nation's League One.

Personal life
Granero's younger brother Roberto was a midfielder who played for over a decade in the third tier. He later coached, as José Carlos' assistant and in his own right. 

His son, Borja, was also a footballer, and all three were youth players at Valencia.

Managerial statistics

References

External links

1963 births
Living people
People from Canal de Navarrés
Sportspeople from the Province of Valencia
Spanish footballers
Footballers from the Valencian Community
Association football defenders
La Liga players
Segunda División players
Segunda División B players
Tercera División players
Valencia CF Mestalla footballers
Valencia CF players
Recreativo de Huelva players
CD Alcoyano footballers
Benidorm CF footballers
Spanish football managers
Segunda División managers
Segunda División B managers
Tercera División managers
Levante UD managers
Gimnàstic de Tarragona managers
Hércules CF managers
Alicante CF managers
SD Ponferradina managers
Deportivo Alavés managers
Real Oviedo managers
UD Melilla managers
Atlético Levante UD managers
Super League Greece managers
Veria F.C. managers
Chinese Super League managers
China League One managers
Shenzhen F.C. managers
Spanish expatriate football managers
Expatriate football managers in Greece
Expatriate football managers in China
Spanish expatriate sportspeople in Greece
Spanish expatriate sportspeople in China